Deebo may refer to:

Deebo Bhattacharya Pakistani-Bangladeshi musician
Deebo Samuel (born 1996), American football player
Deebo, fictional bully in Friday film franchise portrayed by Tommy Lister Jr.

See also
Debo (disambiguation)